Brendan Ellis (born 1951) is an Irish artist and teacher based in Belfast.

Ellis was educated at the Ulster College Northern Ireland Polytechnic, gaining a first class honours diploma. In 1977, Ellis was awarded a master's degree at the Royal College of Art and went on to win the John Minton Drawing Prize.
Ellis has been commissioned to create images for churches in England, a self-portrait for the National Collection, Limerick and has had many solo exhibitions in the Kerlin Gallery, Belfast and the Arts Council of Northern Ireland.
Ellis has worked as a medical artist at the Royal Hospitals in Belfast since 1979.
Ellis work thematically is focused on aspects of the troubles in Northern Ireland, depicting stylized characters against the backdrop of every day scenes of urban life, the characters are clearly affected by the political violence that surrounds them.
Ellis unlike other Northern Irish artists was not shying away from depicting the reality of living in a divided sectarian society where violence had become a normalized part of everyday life. Ellis characters stare out from the canvas, their unknown back story possibly marked by the omni-present violence of sectarianism.
Ellis’ restrained gloomy palette of the sombre urban landscape is populated by demoralized and fearful characters navigating their way through a troubled landscape, their interior personal world is deeply affected by the complexity of the external political forces at work.

https://artuk.org/discover/artists/ellis-brendan-b-1951

References

1951 births
Irish artists
Living people